Yu Xiaoyu is a former Chinese pair skater. With partner Zhang Hao, she is the 2016–17 Grand Prix Final silver medalist, 2017 Asian Winter Games champion and 2018 Chinese national champion. With partner Jin Yang, she is a two-time (2014, 2015) World Junior champion, the 2012 World Junior silver medalist, the 2012 Winter Youth Olympics champion, the 2013–2014 JGP Final champion, and the 2016 Four Continents bronze medalist. She was born in Beijing.

Partnership with Jin Yang
Yu/Jin were paired together by their coaches in 2009. They did on- and off-ice training from eight in the morning to five in the afternoon with a break in the middle.

2010–11 season
Yu/Jin won the silver medal at the 2010 Chinese Nationals. They made their international debut during the 2010–11 season. They won bronze at JGP Cup of Austria and then won gold at Czech Skate. At the Junior Grand Prix Final, they won the bronze medal.

2011–12 season

The pair performed a quad twist at a national competition in 2011, when Yu was 15 and Jin was 17 years old (or 13 and 22). They finished 7th at the 2011 Skate Canada and 6th at the 2011 Cup of China. They then won the bronze medal at their national championships. Yu/Jin competed at the 2012 World Junior Championships and won the silver medal behind teammates and training partners Sui Wenjing/Han Cong.

2012–13 season
In the 2012-13 season, Yu/Jin finished 4th in JGP Austria and 2nd in JGP Croatia in their JGP Events. They finished 5th at the JGP Final. Yu/Jin then competed at the 2013 World Junior Championships and finished 4th.

2013–14 season
Prior to the 2013-14 season, Yu/Jin changed coaches, moving from Luan Bo to Olympic pairs champion Zhao Hongbo, Yao Bin, and Han Bing. They won the gold medals in their JGP events at the 2013 JGP Latvia and 2013 JGP Estonia qualifying them to their fourth JGP Final in Fukuoka, Japan where they won the gold medal. Yu/Jin finished their perfect season by winning gold at the 2014 World Junior Championships in Sofia, Bulgaria.

2014–15 season
In the 2014-15 season, Yu/Jin made their official senior debut on the Grand Prix circuit. They won a silver medal at the 2014 Cup of China and a bronze medal at the 2014 NHK Trophy, qualifying them for their first senior Grand Prix Final in Barcelona, Spain. At the Grand Prix Final they set new personal bests in both the short program and free skate to finish in 5th place. They then went on to win their second national title. With the surprise comeback of Pang/Tong, Yu/Jin were not given a spot to compete at the Four Continents Championships in Seoul and the World Championships in Shanghai, China. Instead, they were sent to the 2015 Winter Universiade where they won the gold medal. It was later announced that they would compete at the 2015 World Junior Figure Skating Championships in Tallinn, Estonia. Despite training senior program layouts for much of the season, they managed to successfully defend their Junior World title, winning both segments of the competition.

2015–16 season
Yu/Jin were assigned to Cup of China and NHK Trophy. They attempted their first throw quadruple salchow in competition at Cup of China and won a bronze medal. They then went on to win silver at 2015 NHK Trophy which helped qualify them for the 2015–16 Grand Prix Final in Barcelona. At the Final they placed 5th.

At the 2016 Four Continents Championships, Yu/Jin claimed the bronze.

Partnership with Zhang Hao

2016–17 season
On April 14, 2016, International Figure Skating magazine broke the news of Yu's new partnership with Zhang Hao. The Chinese Skating Association decided to switch partners between the two pairs of Peng/Zhang and Yu/Jin. They took the silver medal at the 2016 Skate Canada and won gold at the 2016 Cup of China. At the 2016–17 Grand Prix Final in Marseille they won the silver medal behind Evgenia Tarasova / Vladimir Morozov.

2017–18 season
Yu/Zhang began their season at the 2017 Cup of Nice where they placed first. In their first Grand Prix event of the season, Yu/Zhang placed second at the 2017 Cup of China after ranking second in both the short program and free skate. In their second Grand Prix event at 2017 Skate America, Yu/Zhang again placed second after ranking second in both programs. Their scores in both Grand Prix events have qualified Yu/Zhang for the 2017-18 Grand Prix Final, where they placed sixth. They won the Chinese National Championship and were named to the Chinese Olympic and World teams. They placed eighth at the Olympics, and seventh at Worlds.

2018-19 and 2019-20 seasons 

Due to injury, they withdrew from both of their 2018-19 Grand Prix events and did not compete at Nationals. They did not compete again until the 2019-20 Nationals, where they placed fourth.

Partner Change and Retirement

2020-21 season 

In September of 2020, it was reported that Yu and Zhang had split, and that Yu was now paired with Wang Lei. Zhang would announce his retirement later in the season.

In April 2021, she announced her retirement.

Programs

With Zhang Hao

With Jin Yang

Competitive highlights 
GP: Grand Prix; JGP: Junior Grand Prix

With Zhang

With Jin

References

External links 

 
 

1996 births

Living people
Chinese female pair skaters
Figure skaters from Beijing
World Junior Figure Skating Championships medalists
Figure skaters at the 2017 Asian Winter Games
Medalists at the 2017 Asian Winter Games
Asian Games gold medalists for China
Universiade medalists in figure skating
Figure skaters at the 2018 Winter Olympics
Olympic figure skaters of China
Asian Games medalists in figure skating
Figure skaters at the 2012 Winter Youth Olympics
Youth Olympic gold medalists for China
Universiade gold medalists for China
Competitors at the 2015 Winter Universiade
Four Continents Figure Skating Championships medalists